Ding Guangen (September 1929 – July 22, 2012) was a Chinese politician who served in senior leadership roles in the Chinese Communist Party during the 1990s. He was a member of the Politburo of the Chinese Communist Party between 1992 and 2002, a member of the Central Secretariat, and one of the top officials in charge of propaganda and ideology during the term of Party General Secretary and President Jiang Zemin.

Prior to his elevation to the Politburo, Ding served successively as Minister of Railways of China between 1985 and 1988, the chief of the Taiwan Affairs Office between 1988 and 1990, and the head of the United Front Work Department of the party between 1990 and 1992.

Biography 
Ding was born in September 1929 in Wuxi, Jiangsu province. He attended high school in Shanghai. He graduated from Shanghai Jiao Tong University with a degree in engineering. He joined the Communist Party in July 1956.

Ding was elevated to the Politburo of the Chinese Communist Party (CCP) in 1987, and was expected to take on more prominent posts. However, he was forced to resign due to a series of dire railway accidents in 1988. He was demoted to the vice director of the National Planning Commission. Later, Ding became the director of Taiwan Affairs Office of the State Council. He thus became the first politburo member, i.e., Party and nation's leader, who served as a vice Minister in the government after Cultural Revolution. Ding re-emerged in 1989 and took charge of the United Front Work Department of CCP. Since 1992, Ding had served as the head of Central Propaganda Department of CCP, responsible for ideological affairs for 10 years. He retired in 2002 due to his age. 

Ding was a member of 12th, 13th, 14th and 15th Central Committees of the Chinese Communist Party, an alternate member of 13th Politburo, and a full member of 14th and 15th Politburo. Since the 4th plenary session of 13th Central Committee, he was a secretary of Central Secretariat of CCP.

Ding died July 22, 2012, in Beijing at the age of 83, he was eulogized by the party as a "long-tested fighter of the Communist cause".

References 

1929 births
2012 deaths
Politicians from Wuxi
People's Republic of China politicians from Jiangsu
Shanghai Jiao Tong University alumni
Chinese Communist Party politicians from Jiangsu
Chinese people in rail transport
Heads of the Publicity Department of the Chinese Communist Party
Members of the Secretariat of the Chinese Communist Party
Members of the 15th Politburo of the Chinese Communist Party
Members of the 14th Politburo of the Chinese Communist Party
Burials at Babaoshan Revolutionary Cemetery